Cancun International Airport  is located in Cancún, Quintana Roo, on the Caribbean coast of Mexico's Yucatán Peninsula. It is Latin America's third and Mexico's second busiest airport, after Mexico City International Airport. In 2021, Cancún airport handled 22,318,467 passengers, and 30,342,961 passengers in 2022 according to Grupo Aeroportuario del Sureste.

The airport has two parallel operative runways that can be used simultaneously. Officially opened in 1974, the airport is operated by Grupo Aeroportuario del Sureste (ASUR). It is a hub for MAYAir and a focus city for VivaAerobus and Volaris. It currently offers flights to over 20 destinations in Mexico and to over 30 countries in North, Central, and South America and Europe.

Expansion
The airport has been expanding as it has become the second busiest point of entry by air to the country, after Mexico City International Airport. In 2005, ASUR invested US$150million to construct Terminal 3, inaugurated in 2007, and a new runway and a new control tower opened in October 2009.

Terminal 2 was expanded in 2014. A  expansion in Terminal 3 was simultaneously carried out, adding six gates and commercial areas, and it was formally opened in March 2016. The expansion was planned to contribute to increasing annual capacity to 10million from the existing 6million. Terminal 4 was opened at the end of October 2017, much to the excitement of local politicians and vacationers who were growing impatient with an overcrowded airport.

Terminals
The airport has four terminals, all of which are currently in use.

Terminal 1

Terminal 1 has seven gates: 1 through 7A. After suffering damage from Hurricane Wilma, it was temporarily closed for remodeling in order to accommodate charter airlines operating at the airport. It reopened in November 2013 to charter flights, and it also serves two local airlines: Magni and VivaAerobús.

Terminal 2

Terminal 2 at Cancún Airport has 22 gates: A1 through A11 (in a satellite building) and B12 through B22 (at the main building). Most domestic airlines depart from here, along with all international flights to Central and South America and a few long-haul flights to Europe. There is a bank and food outlets in the check-in area, along with several restaurants and shops in the boarding area and immigration/customs services. Two lounges, the MERA Business Lounge and The Lounge by Global Lounge Network, serve domestic and international travelers.

Terminal 3

Terminal 3 has 21 gates: C4 through C24. It has been recently expanded. Most US carriers, as well as some Canadian and European carriers, use this terminal. It offers shops (including duty-free), cafés, and restaurants, as well as immigration/customs services. There is a MERA Business Lounge located in Terminal 3.

Terminal 4

Terminal 4 has 12 gates and opened in October 2017. This made Cancún International the first airport in Mexico to have four terminals. It is able to handle 9million passengers a year. Airlines flying to Terminal 4 include Aeroméxico, Air France, Lufthansa, Air Transat, WestJet, Condor, Southwest Airlines, Air Europa, Frontier Airlines, Sun Country Airlines and JetBlue. An on-site hotel is also planned to be opened, as well as a parking structure. Three lounges serve Terminal 4. They are the MERA Business Lounge (National), MERA Business Lounge (International), and The Lounge in Partnership with Air Transat.

Airlines and destinations

Passenger

Notes
TUI fly Belgium's flight from Brussels to Cancún makes a stop in Havana; however, the airline does not have traffic rights from Havana to Cancún.

Turkish Airlines's flight from Istanbul to Cancún makes a stop in Mexico City; however, the airline does not have local traffic rights from Mexico City to Cancún.

Cargo

Traffic statistics

Passengers

Busiest routes

Note

Accidents and incidents
On March 15, 1984, Aerocozumel Flight 261 crashed soon after takeoff. No one died in the crash, but one of the passengers died of a heart attack while evacuating away from the swampy crash scene.
 On September 9, 2009, Mexico City-bound Aeroméxico Flight 576 was hijacked after take off. The hijackers were Bolivians who wanted to speak to the President. The plane landed safely in Mexico City, and the hijackers were arrested.

Accolades
2011 – Best Airport in Latin America – Caribbean of the Airport Service Quality Awards by Airports Council International and 2nd Best Airport by Size in the 5 to 15 million passenger category

See also 
 List of the busiest airports in Mexico
 List of the busiest airports in Latin America

Notes

References

External links 

 Cancun Airport (ASUR: Aeropuertos del Sureste) (in English)
 
 
 
 Cancun airport travel data at Airportsdata.net (in English)
 Cancun airport Terminal 2 Map at Transcun.com (in English)
 Arrivals and Departures at Cancun Airport (in English)
 Airport Cancun Arrivals and Departures at Cancun Airport (in English)

Cancún
Airports in Quintana Roo
Airports established in 1974